The Hazarbuz (Pashto: هزاربوز) meaning thousand goats are a Pashtun nomadic tribe. They primarily live in the Rodat district of Nangarhar, Kabul, Mazar e sharif, Herat, Peshawar, Islamabad and belong to Afghanistan. 

They are non-Ghilzai Powandah Hazarbuz nomads which have historically travelled the routes between eastern Afghanistan, Pakistan and Turkestan for centuries, a region related to the Silk Road, an ancient route between the East and the West of Asia. Traditionally, Hazarbuz were involved in transport activities with their camels and are doing trade from centuries along with the pioneers Sulemankhel Ahmadzai and other Powandah nomadic merchant tribes. 

They shipped a variety of products from Afghanistan  to the Indus lowland. Their key source of revenue has come from the import and sale of tea, and some other products particularly from Bukhara, in the northern regions of Afghanistan. They are famous for their trading and business.

References

Sarbani Pashtun tribes
Social groups of Pakistan